Zwei Ärzte sind einer zu viel is a German television series.

See also
List of German television series

External links
 

2006 German television series debuts
2009 German television series endings
Television shows set in Bavaria
German medical television series
German-language television shows
ZDF original programming